Cyrtodactylus metropolis  is a species of gecko that is endemic to peninsular Malaysia.

References 

Cyrtodactylus
Reptiles described in 2014